Phenylsodium C6H5Na is an organosodium compound. Solid phenylsodium was first isolated by Nef in 1903. Although the behavior of phenylsodium and phenyl magnesium bromide are similar, the organosodium compound is very rarely used.

Synthesis
The existence of phenylsodium was originally proposed by August Kekulé after observing the formation of sodium benzoate in the reaction of bromobenzene with sodium under carbon dioxide.

Transmetalation
In the original synthesis, diphenylmercury and sodium was shown to yield a suspension of phenylsodium:
(C6H5)2Hg + 3 Na → 2 C6H5Na + NaHg

The Shorigen reaction is also used in the generation of phenylsodium, where an alkyl sodium compound is treated with benzene:
 RNa + C6H6 → RH + C6H5Na
The method can also result in the addition of a second sodium. This dimetallation occurs in the meta and para positions. The use of certain alkyl sodium compounds such as n-amyl sodium is known to greatly increase this dimetallation effect.

Metal-halogen exchange
A common route to phenylsodium utilizes powdered sodium with bromobenzene:
 C6H5Br   +  2 Na   →    C6H5Na  +  NaBr
The yield of this method is lowered by the formation of diphenyl due to phenylsodium reacting with aryl halide starting material

Lithium exchange
A more modern synthesis involves the reaction of phenyllithium and NaOtBu: 
C6H5Li + NaOtBu → C6H5Na + LiOtBu

Properties and structure

The first syntheses of phenylsodium which employed the organomercury route seemed to yield a light brown powder. It was discovered by Wilhelm Schlenk that this product was contaminated by a sodium amalgum. Centrifugation allowed for the isolation of pure phenylsodium which appears as a yellowish-white amorphous powder which readily bursts into flames. 

Like phenyllithium, adducts of the compound with PMDTA have been crystallized. While phenyllithium forms a monomeric adduct with PMDTA, phenylsodium exists as a dimer, reflecting the larger radium of sodium.

Complexes of phenylsodium and magnesium alkoxides, especially magnesium 2-ethoxyethoxide Mg(OCH2CH2OEt)2, are soluble in benzene. The complex is formed by the reaction:
 NaPh + Mg(OCH2CH2OEt)2 → Na2MgPh2(OCH2CH2OEt)2
Although the phenylsodium is complexed, it maintains its phenylation and metalation ability. Additionally, the complex is highly stable in benzene retaining its reactivity after a month of storage.

Phenyllithium can also be used to modify the properties of phenylsodium. Ordinarily, phenylsodium reacts violently with diethyl ether, but Georg Wittig showed that by synthesizing PhNa with PhLi in ether, the complex (C6H5Li)(C6H5Na)n was formed. The phenylsodium component of the complex reacts before the phenyllithium, making it an effective compound to stabilize the highly reactive sodium compound. This complex could be isolated as solid crystals which were soluble in ether and remained stable in solution at room temperature for several days. Phenyllithium is able to stabilize phenylsodium in a ratio as high as 1:24 Li:Na, although this produces an insoluble mass which could be still used for reactions.

Reactions
Reactions involving phenylsodium were employed as early as the mid 19th century, although before 1903. Typically phenylsodium is prepared in situ analogous to methods used for Grignard reagents. The work of Acree provides a number of examples of reactions involving the compound.

Cross-coupling
The reaction with ethyl bromide produces ethyl benzene:
NaPh + BrEt → PhEt + NaBr

An analogous reaction also occurs in the preparation of phenylsodium to produce diphenyl:
NaPh + PhBr → Ph-Ph + NaBr

Reaction of benzyl chloride and phenylsodium results in diphenylmethane and (E)-stilbene. Diphenylmethane is the expected product from the substitution of chloride. The formation of stilbene is implicates radical intermediates like those proposed in the Wurtz-Fittig reaction mechanism.

The reaction of phenylsodium with benzoyl chloride yields, after hydrolysis, triphenylcarbinol. Benzophenone is proposed as an intermediate.
2NaPh + PhCOCl → Ph3CONa + NaCl

Metallation
Metallation reactions with phenylsodium proceed in the following general form:
 PhNa + RH → C6H6 + RNa
The metallation is confirmed/detected by treatment of the metallated compound with carbon dioxide, affording the corresponding sodium carboxylate which can be acidified to yield the carboxylic acid: 
RNa + CO2 → RCO2Na 

Metallation follows a generally predictable order of reactivity. Benzene can be metallated by alkylsodium compounds resulting in phenylsodium. The phenylsodium is then able to metallate other aromatic compounds. The most commonly used reagent for metallation by phenylsodium is toluene, producing benzylsodium. Toluene can be metallated by synthesizing phenylsodium in toluene instead of benzene:
C6H5Cl + 2Na + C6H5CH3 → C6H6 + NaCl + C6H5CH2Na
The benzylsodium can then be used in a nucleophilic addition. The effectiveness of the metallation can be determined by carbonating and isolating the phenylacetic acid product.

See also
Phenylcopper

References

Organosodium compounds
Phenyl compounds